Torshakan (also Romanized as Torshakān; also known as Torshkanān) is a village in Mokriyan-e Sharqi Rural District, in the Central District of Mahabad County, West Azerbaijan Province, Iran. At the 2006 census, its population was 404, in 88 families.

References 

Populated places in Mahabad County